Levan Gotua (10 March 1905 – 30 January 1973) was a Soviet writer.

Gotua was born and died in Tbilisi and was best known for his historical novels. One of his most famous works was "Gmirta Varami", which is fueled by the writer's great love of his country and the rich history of Georgia.

Soviet writers
1905 births
1973 deaths
Writers from Tbilisi